Desolation Island may refer to:

 Kerguelen Islands, Indian Ocean
 Desolación Island, Chile
 Desolation Island (South Shetland Islands)
 Desolation Island (novel), a novel by Patrick O'Brian

See also
 Desolation Sound, a deep water sound in British Columbia, Canada